Chiraz Latiri Cherif (born 1972) is a Tunisian academic, cultural researcher and politician. In 2006, she joined the staff of Manouba University where she specialized in cinema and multimedia. After heading the Tunisian Cinema and Image Centre (2017–2019), in February 2020 she was appointed Minister of Culture. That month, the Arab Cinema Center and The Hollywood Reporter honoured Latiri with the Arab Cinema Personality of The Year award.

Biography
Born on 24 March 1972 in Hammam Sousse, Chiraz Latiri Cherif completed her school education in 1989 with a baccalaureate from the Lycée de Garçons de Sousse. She went on to study at the Institut supérieur de gestion de Tunis (1990-1994), Tunis University (1995–1997) and at the Ecole Nationale des Sciences de l’Informatique where she earned a doctorate in computer science in 2004. She subsequently earned an HDR research diploma at the University of Lorraine in 2013.

In 2006, Latiri was appointed director of ISAMM, the Manouba Higher Institute of Arts and Multimedia. By implementing cooperation with France, she succeeded in developing training in film, virtual reality and computer games. From July 2017 to November 2019, she served as director-general at CNCI, the Tunisian Cinema and Image Centre, where she initiated a number of international film projects including The Arab Film Platform. At CNCI, she also created a Creative Digital Lab, a Gaming Lab and the national programme Tunisia Games Factory.

In February 2020, Latiri was appointed Tunisian Minister of Culture in the government of Elyes Fakhfakh. The same month, the Arab Cinema Center and The Hollywood Reporter honoured Latiri with the Arab Cinema Personality of The Year award.

References

1972 births
People from Sousse Governorate
Women government ministers of Tunisia
Government ministers of Tunisia
Academic staff of Manouba University
University of Lorraine alumni
Living people
Culture ministers
21st-century Tunisian women politicians
21st-century Tunisian politicians